Hurt!!!!!!! is the debut album by American recording artist Timi Yuro. It peaked at #51 on the Billboard Top LPs chart in 1961. It's biggest hit was "Hurt", which peaked at No. 4 on the Billboard Hot 100.

Track listing

Side one
"For You" – 2:30
"Cry" – 3:35
"You'll Never Know" – 3:10
"Trying" – 2:35
"Hurt" – 2:28
"I Won't Cry Anymore" – 2:28

Side two
"A Little Bird Told Me" – 2:28
"I Should Care" – 3:25
"Just Say I Love Him" – 2:55
"And That Reminds Me" – 2:35
"I'm Confessin' (That I Love You)" – 2:52
"I Apologize" – 2:50

Charts

References

1961 debut albums